"Lonely" is a song by British-Australian singer Peter Andre. It was released in October 1997 as the second single from his third studio album, Time (1997). "Lonely" peaked at number six on the UK Singles Chart, becoming his sixth top-10 single.

Track listings
UK CD1
 "Lonely" (radio edit)
 "Just for You" (live at Wembley)
 "You Are" (live at Wembley)
 "Lonely" (live at Wembley)
 
UK CD2
 "Lonely" (radio edit)
 "Just for You" (album version)
 "Lonely" (accapella)
 "Lonely" (the video)

UK cassette single and European CD single
 "Lonely" (radio edit)
 "Just for You" (album version)

Charts

References

 

 
1997 songs
1997 singles
Songs written by Peter Andre
Mushroom Records singles
Peter Andre songs
Song recordings produced by Cutfather & Joe
UK Independent Singles Chart number-one singles